Protolabeo protolabeo is a species of cyprinid fish endemic to the Yilihe River in Yunnan, China.  It is the only member of its genus.

References

Cyprinid fish of Asia
Freshwater fish of China
Fish described in 2010
Labeoninae